Pomaderris helianthemifolia is a species of flowering plant in the family Rhamnaceae and is endemic to south-eastern continental Australia. It is a bushy shrub with hairy young stems, narrowly elliptic to lance-shaped leaves with the narrower end towards the base, and small panicles of hairy yellowish flowers.

Description
The upper surface of the leaves glabrous and the lower surface is densely covered with soft, greyish, star-shaped hairs. The flowers are borne in panicles  of about twenty to fifty and are yellowish.

Taxonomy
This species was first formally described in 1858 by Siegfried Reissek who gave it the name Trymalium helianthemifolium in Linnaea: ein Journal für die Botanik in ihrem ganzen Umfange, oder Beiträge zur Pflanzenkunde, from specimens collected by Ferdinand von Mueller in "Gipps Land". In 1951, Norman Arthur Wakefield changed the name to Pomaderris helianthemifolia in The Victorian Naturalist.

In 1997, Neville Grant Walsh and F. Coates described two subspecies in the journal Muelleria, and the names and those of the autonym are accepted by the Australian Plant Census:
 Pomaderris helianthemifolia (Reissek) N.A.Wakef. subsp. helianthemifolia (the autonym);

Distribution and habitat
This pomaderris usually grows on the banks of rocky streams. Subspecies helianthemifolia is only known from two restricted areas in Gippsland, in the Maffra-Briagolong area and near the Genoa River. Subspecies hispida is widespread, but not common in a few locations in New South Wales and in north-eastern Victoria and subspecies minor is found in north-eastern Victoria, but no longer occurs near Bendigo.

References

helianthemifolia
Flora of New South Wales
Flora of Victoria (Australia)
Plants described in 1858